Railways Ground is a multi-use stadium in Faisalabad, Pakistan.  It is primarily used for football and is currently the home ground of Lyallpur FC in Pakistan Premier League. The stadium holds 10,000 spectators. people.

References

Football venues in Pakistan